Cary Leibowitz, also sometimes known as Candy Ass (born 1963), is an American visual artist. Leibowitz's work can be found in the permanent collection of the Chase Manhattan Bank, the Hirshhorn Museum, The Jewish Museum, and the Peter and Eileen Norton Collection. Leibowitz's work will be the subject of a career survey at the Contemporary Jewish Museum, San Francisco in  January 2017.

References

External links
 Village Voice: Cary Leibowitz
 The New York Times: Cary Leibowitz
 Heartsarena Blog: Cary Leibowitz
 Kunstwissen: Cary Leibowitz
 Inliquid Review: Cary Leibowitz
 Now Toronto: Cary Leibowitz
 Artcal: Cary Leibowitz
 Art Metropole: Cary Leibowitz
 Art Metropole: Cary Leibowitz Artist's Talk
 Inliquid Review: Cary Leibowitz, Arcadia
 ArtForum: Cary Leibowitz
 Jewish Culture.org: Cary Leibowitz
 

1963 births
Living people
Jewish American artists
21st-century American Jews